Asbury Theological Seminary is a Christian Wesleyan seminary in the historical Methodist tradition located in Wilmore, Kentucky. It is the largest seminary of the Wesleyan-Holiness movement. It is known for its advocacy of egalitarianism, giving equal status for men and women in ministerial roles and for ordination. It is accredited by the Commission on Colleges of the Southern Association of Colleges and Schools and the Association of Theological Schools in the United States and Canada (ATS).

History

Asbury Theological Seminary was founded in Wilmore, Kentucky, in 1923 by its first president, Henry Clay Morrison, who was at the time the president of Asbury College. In 1940, Asbury Seminary separated from the college in order to satisfy accreditation requirements. Because of the proximity of the two schools (across the street), similar name, and common theological heritage, many people confuse the relationship between the college and the seminary.  While they are separate institutions, the schools maintain a collegial relationship that benefits both communities. The current president of Asbury Theological Seminary is Dr. Timothy Tennent, Ph.D., who has served as the eighth president since July 1, 2009.

Presidents
 Henry Clay Morrison (1923–1942)
 J.C. McPheeters (1942–1962)
 Frank Stanger (1962–1982)
 David McKenna (1982–1994)
 Maxie Dunnam (1994–2004)
 Jeff Greenway (2004–2006)
 Ellsworth Kalas (2006–2009)
 Timothy Tennent (2009–present)

Extended education
In addition to the main campus at Wilmore, the seminary offers courses at the Florida Dunnam Campus in  Orlando, Florida, through online courses (Extended Learning), and extension sites in Memphis, Tennessee, and Tulsa, Oklahoma.

Accreditation
Asbury Theological Seminary is accredited by the Commission on Colleges of the Southern Association of Colleges and Schools to award master's and doctoral degrees. It is an accredited member of The Association of Theological Schools in the United States and Canada. Asbury Theological Seminary does not, within the context of its religious principles, its heritage, its mission, and its goals, discriminate on the basis of race, color, national origin, age, physical impairment, or gender in administration of its admission policies, educational policies, scholarship, and loan programs, athletic or other school-administered programs. The seminary is authorized under federal law to enroll nonimmigrant alien students.

Academic Schools
Asbury Theological Seminary has five academic schools. 
 School of Biblical Interpretation
 E. Stanley Jones School of World Mission and Evangelism
 School of Theology & Formation
 Beeson School of Practical Theology
 Orlando School of Ministry

Notable faculty

 Craig S. Keener, professor of New Testament, known for his expertise in Greco-Roman and Jewish sources
 John N. Oswalt, visiting distinguished professor of Old Testament, involved with the NIV and NLT Bible translations and author of a major commentary on Isaiah
 Ben Witherington III, Jean R. Amos Professor of New Testament for Doctoral Studies and prolific author
 Bill T. Arnold, Paul S. Amos Professor of Old Testament Interpretation and associate editor of NICOT a major Old Testament commentary series 
 Kenneth J. Collins, Professor of Historical Theology and Wesley Studies, prominent John Wesley scholar

Notable alumni

Jacob DeShazer, a member of the Doolittle Raid, prisoner of war in Japan, and then a missionary to Japan in the Free Methodist Church
Jim Garlow, pastor of Skyline Church in San Diego
Alfred W. Gwinn, former United Methodist Bishop of the North Carolina Annual Conference
Stephen Hance, Church of England priest and Dean of Derby Cathedral
Joe Hilley, (class of 1984), New York Times bestselling author
James W. Holsinger, M.Div., former chair of Board of Trustees, former member of the Board of Trustees, and nominated United States Surgeon General
David Seamands, United Methodist pastor and writer
Ted Strickland (class of 1967), 68th Governor of Ohio and former member of the United States House of Representatives.

References

External links
Official website

 
Seminaries and theological colleges in Kentucky
Educational institutions established in 1923
Universities and colleges accredited by the Southern Association of Colleges and Schools
Buildings and structures in Jessamine County, Kentucky
Christianity in Orlando, Florida
Universities and colleges in Orlando, Florida
Seminaries and theological colleges in Florida
Education in Jessamine County, Kentucky
1923 establishments in Kentucky
Methodist seminaries and theological colleges
Methodism in Kentucky
Methodism in Florida